Cyclin-dependent kinase 9 or CDK9 is a cyclin-dependent kinase associated with P-TEFb.

Function 

The protein encoded by this gene is a member of the cyclin-dependent kinase (CDK) family. CDK family members are highly similar to the gene products of S. cerevisiae cdc28, and S. pombe cdc2, and known as important cell cycle regulators. This kinase was found to be a component of the multiprotein complex TAK/P-TEFb, which is an elongation factor for RNA polymerase II-directed transcription and functions by phosphorylating the C-terminal domain of the largest subunit of RNA polymerase II. This protein forms a complex with and is regulated by its regulatory subunit cyclin T or cyclin K. HIV-1 Tat protein was found to interact with this protein and cyclin T, which suggested a possible involvement of this protein in AIDS.

CDK9 is also known to associate with other proteins such as TRAF2, and be involved in differentiation of skeletal muscle.

Inhibitors
Based on molecular docking results, Ligands-3, 5, 14, and 16 were screened among 17 different Pyrrolone-fused benzosuberene compounds as potent and specific inhibitors without any cross-reactivity against different CDK isoforms. Analysis of MD simulations and MM-PBSA studies, revealed the binding energy profiles of all the selected complexes. Selected ligands performed better than the experimental drug candidate (Roscovitine). Ligands-5 and 16 show specificity for CDK9. These ligands are expected to possess lower risk of side effects due to their natural origin.

Interactions
CDK9 has been shown to interact with:

 Androgen receptor, 
 CDC34 and 
 CCNK, 
 CCNT1, 
 CCNT2, 
 MYBL2, 
 RELA, 
 RB1, 
 SKP1A. 
 SUPT5H, and
 RNAP II.

References

Further reading

External links
 
 Drosophila Cyclin dependent kinase 9 - The Interactive Fly
 
 

Cell cycle
Proteins
EC 2.7.11